Michael Maybrick (31 January 1841 – 26 August 1913) was an English composer and singer, best known under his pseudonym Stephen Adams as the composer of "The Holy City", one of the most popular religious songs in English.

Songs
The Holy City
 A Warrior Bold

Early life
Maybrick was born at 8 Church Alley, Liverpool, the fourth of the eight children of William Maybrick, an engraver and his wife, Susannah. Both his grandfather and father served as parish clerk at St Peter's, Liverpool, and were minor composers. His uncle Michael Maybrick was organist at St Peter's, wrote sacred music, and conducted the Liverpool Choral Society. Having become proficient on the piano by the age of eight, the young Maybrick studied the organ with W. T. Best and at the age of fifteen became organist of St Peter's; he also wrote anthems and had a work performed in London.

Musical career

On the advice of his godfather, Alfred Mellon, in 1865 Maybrick went to Leipzig to study keyboard and harmony with Carl Reinecke, Ignaz Moscheles, and Louis Plaidy, but later decided to train as a baritone with Gaetano Nava in Milan. After gaining experience in Italian theatres, he appeared with great success in London on 25 February 1869 in Mendelssohn's Elijah. Further success came as Telramund in Wagner's Lohengrin led to appearances with Charlotte Sainton-Dolby, including her farewell concert on 6 June 1870, and to regular engagements at the English festivals and with the Carl Rosa Opera Company. He appeared as a baritone at all the leading concert venues in London and the provinces, as well as in English opera.

By the early 1870s Maybrick was singing his own songs, beginning with "A Warrior Bold". Published under the pseudonym Stephen Adams and mostly with lyrics by Fred Weatherly, his songs achieved extraordinary popularity. His early sea song "Nancy Lee" sold more than 100,000 copies in two years. Maybrick penned other sea songs including "The Tar's Farewell", "They All Love Jack" and "The Midshipmite", sentimental songs such as "Your Dear Brown Eyes", romantic numbers  like "The Children of the City", and sacred songs like "The Blue Alsatian Mountains", "The Star of Bethlehem", and the well-loved "The Holy City". In 1884 he toured the New Zealand performing his own songs. His friends spoke of his charming personality, but others thought him arrogant and vain. He composed one of the earliest musical settings of A. E. Housman, 'When I was one-and-twenty' in 1904, the same year Arthur Somervell published his A Shropshire Lad song cycle.

Retirement
Maybrick was a keen amateur sportsman, being a cricketer, a yachtsman and a cyclist, and a captain in the Artists Rifles. On 9 March 1893 he married his forty-year-old housekeeper, Laura Withers, and settled with her at Ryde on the Isle of Wight. 

They were joined there by the two children of his brother, James Maybrick, later a suspect in the Jack the Ripper case, and whose wife Florence was convicted of his murder in 1889. (A re-examination of her case resulted in her release in 1904). Michael Maybrick himself is named as Jack the Ripper by the film director Bruce Robinson in his book on the subject. 

He became chairman of the Isle of Wight Hospital, was a magistrate and was five times mayor of Ryde. He was also a Freemason. He had been at Buxton for three weeks being treated for periodic gout when he died in his sleep of heart failure on 26 August 1913. He was buried four days later at Ryde.

Notes

References
'Obituary: Michael Maybrick', The Musical Times, Vol. 54, No. 848 (Oct. 1, 1913), pp. 661–662

External links
 
 
 
Obituary in Liverpool Mercury, 30 August 1913
 Jack the Ripper Revealed: They All Love Jack.Interview with Bruce Robinson. GQ magazine October 2015
 Stephen Adams recordings at the Discography of American Historical Recordings.

1841 births
1913 deaths
Artists' Rifles officers
English composers
19th-century British male singers
Jack the Ripper
Musicians from Liverpool
Freemasons of the United Grand Lodge of England